Frank Mazzei (November 22, 1912 – September 27, 1977) is a former Democratic member of the Pennsylvania State Senate. One of his big accomplishments during his political career was creation of the Pennsylvania Lottery.  In 1975 he was arrested for taking kickbacks and was jailed until 1977.

Biography
He began his career as a ward captain in the 17th ward in the South Side in Pittsburgh and later worked as a clerk and paymaster for the "Allegheny County Workhouse." He served as an alternate delegate to the Democratic National Convention in 1956 and 1964. He was a member of the Knights of Columbus.

He was elected to represent the 43rd senatorial district in the Pennsylvania State Senate in a special election in 1967. He was known as a "dapper dresser" and for his monogrammed shirts. He was powerful politician who rarely needed to campaign. His legislative career is best known for being the main force behind the creation of the Pennsylvania Lottery.

Arrest and conviction
He was convicted on federal extortion charges for taking $20,000 in kickbacks on state office in the South Side space leased to BMI Corporation. He was acquitted of perjury charges in that same trial, but was sentenced to 1 to 5 years in prison on others. He was unanimously expelled from the Pennsylvania State Senate on June 2, 1975, making him the first person ever expelled from that chamber. He entered federal prison in December 1975.

Release
He was paroled from a federal prison facility in Missouri in Spring 1977 because he was severely stricken with cancer. At the time of his death on September 27, 1977, he was awaiting a separate federal trial, with 69 co-defendants, in connection to a bail bond scheme.

References

1912 births
1977 deaths
Democratic Party Pennsylvania state senators
Politicians from Pittsburgh
Deaths from cancer in Pennsylvania
Politicians convicted of extortion under color of official right
Pennsylvania politicians convicted of crimes
20th-century American politicians